Sharon is an unincorporated community and coal town in southeastern Kanawha County, West Virginia, United States, located along the West Virginia Turnpike.

Geography
Sharon is located at  (38.159549, -81.447059) along Cabin Creek. It has an elevation of 673 feet (205 m).

Transportation
Sharon is located on Secondary State Route 79/3, locally known as Cabin Creek Road.  Exit 79 of Interstate 77 is located here; no services are available at the exit.

Until the 1980s, a rail spur ran from the CSX railroad tracks up a short hollow, serving a coal mine tipple. The remnants of the tracks and rail bed can still be seen at present day along Paint Branch, however, no sign remains of the at-grade crossing of Cabin Creek Road or the trestle that crossed Cabin Creek.

As a result of the badly needed upgrade of the West Virginia Turnpike to Interstate standards, multiple homes occupying the adjacent land were bought by the state and demolished.

The cemetery is hidden behind the few homes that sit at the bottom of Sharon Hill or some call Sharon mountain. There are about 12 houses in the hollow and a church at the bottom to the left as soon as you cross the Cabin Creek bridge.  If you park at the church you can walk up the road and behind the houses the mountain cemetery begins. There are generations of graves here back farther than 1700. It is a straight up hike with a narrow path of family plot after plot.  This trek is not for the weary. There are rattlesnakes and it is steep. The families buried here have mined coal and farmed the Appalachias for centuries. Some of the family names include Basham, Totten, Burns, Perry, Harlow, and many more. This mountain forest cemetery is covered in flowers from top to bottom from families who keep their family traditions.

Sharon had a United States Post Office until the early 1990s, the ZIP code was 25182.

References

Unincorporated communities in Kanawha County, West Virginia
Unincorporated communities in West Virginia
Coal towns in West Virginia